The Untouchables is an American crime drama produced by Desilu Productions that ran from 1959 to 1963 on the ABC Television Network. Based on the memoir of the same name by Eliot Ness and Oscar Fraley, it fictionalized experiences of Eliot Ness as a Prohibition agent, fighting crime in Chicago in the 1930s with the help of a special team of agents handpicked for their courage, moral character, and incorruptibility, nicknamed the Untouchables. The book was later made into a celebrated film in 1987 by Brian De Palma, with a script by David Mamet, and a second, less-successful TV series in 1993.

A dynamic, hard-hitting action drama, and a landmark television crime series, The Untouchables won series star Robert Stack an Emmy Award for Best Actor in a Dramatic Series in 1960.

Series overview

The series originally focused on the efforts of a real-life squad of Prohibition agents employed by the United States Department of Justice and led by Eliot Ness (Stack) that helped bring down the bootleg empire of "Scarface" Al Capone, as described in Ness's bestselling 1957 memoir. This squad was nicknamed "The Untouchables" because of its courage and honesty; squad members could not be bribed or intimidated by the mob. Eliot Ness himself had died suddenly in May 1957, shortly before his memoir and the subsequent TV adaptation were to bring him fame beyond any he experienced in his lifetime.

The pilot for the series, a two-part episode entitled "The Untouchables," originally aired on CBS's Westinghouse Desilu Playhouse on April 20 and 27, 1959. Later re-titled "The Scarface Mob", these episodes, which featured Neville Brand as Al Capone, were the only episodes in the series to be more-or-less directly based on Ness's memoir, and ended with the conviction and imprisonment of Capone. CBS, which had broadcast most of Desilu's television output since 1951 beginning with I Love Lucy, was offered the new series following the success of the pilot film. Chairman William S. Paley rejected it on the advice of network vice president Hubbell Robinson. ABC agreed to air the series, and The Untouchables premiered on October 15, 1959. In the pilot movie, the mobsters generally spoke with unrealistic pseudo-Italian accents, but this idiosyncratic pronunciation was dropped when the series debuted.

The weekly series first dramatized a power struggle to establish a new boss in Capone's absence (for the purpose of the TV series, the new boss was Frank Nitti, although this was, as usual for the series, contrary to fact). As the series continued, there developed a highly fictionalized portrayal of Ness and his crew as all-purpose, multi-agency crime fighters who went up against an array of 1930s-era gangsters and villains, including Ma Barker, Dutch Schultz, Bugs Moran, Vincent "Mad Dog" Coll, Legs Diamond, Lucky Luciano, and in one episode, Nazi agents. On many occasions during the series run, Ness would blatantly violate suspects' Fourth Amendment rights with no legal ramifications.

The terse narration by gossip columnist Walter Winchell, in his distinctive New York accent, was a stylistic hallmark of the series, along with its ominous theme music by Nelson Riddle and its shadowy black-and-white photography, which was influenced by film noir.

Controversy

The show drew harsh criticism from some Italian-Americans, including Frank Sinatra, who felt it promoted negative stereotypes of them as mobsters and gangsters. The Capone family unsuccessfully sued CBS, Desilu Productions, and Westinghouse Electric Corporation for their depiction of the Capone family. In the first episode of the first season, the character of "Agent (Rico) Rossi", a person of Italian extraction who had witnessed a gangland murder, was added to Ness's team.

On March 9, 1961, Anthony Anastasio, chief of the Brooklyn waterfront and its International Longshoremen's Association, marched in line with a picket group who identified themselves as "The Federation of Italian-American Democratic Organizations". In protest formation outside the ABC New York headquarters, they had come together to urge the public boycott of Liggett & Myers Tobacco Company (L&M) products, including Chesterfield cigarettes, the lead sponsor of The Untouchables. They expressed displeasure with the program, which to them vilified Italian-Americans, stereotyping them as the singular criminal element. The boycott and the attendant firestorm of publicity had the effect Anastasio and his confederates wanted. Four days after the picket of ABC, L&M, denying it had bowed to intimidation, announced it would drop its sponsorship of The Untouchables, maintaining the decision was based on network-scheduling conflicts. The following week, the head of Desilu, Desi Arnaz (who had attended high school with Capone's son Albert), in concert with ABC and the "Italian-American League to Combat Defamation", issued a formal three-point manifesto:

 There will be no more fictional hoodlums with Italian names in future productions.
 There will be more stress on the law-enforcement role of "Rico Rossi", Ness's right-hand man on the show.
 There will be an emphasis on the "formidable influence" of Italian-American officials in reducing crime and an emphasis on the "great contributions" made to American culture by Americans of Italian descent.

The series also incurred the displeasure of the powerful director of the Federal Bureau of Investigation, J. Edgar Hoover, when the fictionalized scripts depicted Ness and his Treasury agents involved in operations that were actually the province of the FBI. The second episode of the series, for example, depicted Ness and his crew involved in the capture of the Ma Barker gang, an incident in which the real-life Ness played no part. The producers agreed to insert a spoken disclaimer on future broadcasts of the episode stating that the FBI had primary responsibility for the Barker case.

The Untouchables was an unusually violent program for its time and its excessive violence and surprisingly frank depictions of drug abuse and prostitution were described by the National Association for Better Radio and Television as "not fit for the television screen". Several episodes included depictions of violence toward children.

In an article titled "The New Enemies of 'The Untouchables'" Ayn Rand argued that the persistent, superficial attacks received by The Untouchables were due to its appeal and its virtues: its moral conflict and moral purpose.

Episodes and cast

The series had 118 episodes which ran 50 minutes each. Though the book chronicled the experiences of Ness and his cohorts against Capone, and in reality the Untouchables disbanded soon after Capone's conviction, the series continued after the pilot and book ended, depicting the fictitious further exploits of the Untouchables against many, often real life, criminals over a span of time ranging from 1929 to 1935. The television episodes were broadcast in no chronological timeline, but were set mostly in the early 1930s (for example, one episode, "You Can't Pick the Number", begins with Winchell's words, "October 1932: the depth of the Depression"), and another episode "Canada Run" begins at Chicago Stadium at the NFL Playoff Game on December 18, 1932. A few episodes were set primarily in a locale other than Chicago (such as the one dealing with the shootout involving Ma Barker and her gang.) Characters and "facts" in the majority of the episodes were more often than not entirely fictitious or loosely based composites of true-life criminals of that era. The gripping theme music was by Nelson Riddle.

Quinn Martin produced the show's first season, which contained elements that could be found in future TV series produced by Martin.

The most prominent Untouchables were portrayed by:
 Robert Stack as Agent Eliot Ness
 Nicholas Georgiade as Agent Enrico "Rico" Rossi
 Paul Picerni as Agent Lee Hobson, (second season on)
 Abel Fernandez as Agent William Youngfellow
 Steve London as Agent Jack Rossman (portrayed in the pilot by Paul Dubov)

Other Untouchables members who were prominent at first, but didn't last past the pilot or the first season, were portrayed by :

 Jerry Paris as Agent Martin Flaherty, (first season only-portrayed in the pilot by Bill Williams)
 Chuck Hicks as Agent LaMarr Kane (first season only-portrayed in the pilot by Peter Leeds) killed off in the first season episode, "The Tri-State Gang."
 Anthony George as Agent Cam Allison, (first season only) killed off in the Season 1 finale, "The Frank Nitti Story"
 Keenan Wynn as Agent Joe Fuselli (pilot episode only)
 Eddie Firestone as Agent Eric Hansen (pilot episode only)
 Robert Osterloh as Agent Tom Kopka (pilot episode only)

In addition to the Untouchables themselves, there were several recurring allies in more than one episode:
 Frank Wilcox as Federal District Attorney Beecher Asbury
 Robert Bice as Police Capt. Johnson
 Jason Wingreen as Police Capt. Dorset
 Raymond Bailey as US Attorney for New York John Carvell
 Barbara Nichols as Brandy La France, showgirl and wife/widow of an informant, appearing in both the pilot and premiere
 Dane Clark as Dr. Victor Garr
 John Gabriel as Dr. Daniel Gilford
 Barbara Stanwyck as Lt. Agatha Stewart, head of the Missing Persons Bureau
 Ed Asner as Frank, one of Agatha Stewart's assistants
 Virginia Capers as June, one of Agatha Stewart's assistants

The show also had several recurrent gangsters, many of them loosely based on real life gangsters of the time period:

 Frank Nitti, Capone's enforcer who takes over the Chicago mob after Capone is imprisoned, portrayed by Bruce Gordon, and appearing in far more episodes than any other gangster
 Joe Kulak, portrayed by Oscar Beregi, Jr.
 Dutch Schultz, portrayed in different episodes by Lawrence Dobkin, Robert J. Wilke, and Warren J. Kemmerling
 Jake "Greasy Thumb" Guzik, portrayed in the pilot by Bern Hoffman, and in the series by Nehemiah Persoff
 George "Bugs" Moran, portrayed in different episodes by Lloyd Nolan, Robert J. Wilke, and Harry Morgan
 Louis Lepke Buchalter, portrayed in different episodes by Gene Roth, Robert Carricart, and Joseph Ruskin
 Lucky Luciano, portrayed by Robert Carricart
 Pete Konitz, portrayed by Carl Milletaire
 Frankie Resko, portrayed by Grant Richards
 Al Capone, portrayed by Neville Brand, and appearing only in the 2 hour pilot and a 2 part episode
 Louis Campagna, portrayed by Frank de Kova
 Augie Viale, portrayed by John Beradino
 Little Charlie Sebastino, portrayed by Henry Silva
 Louis Latito, portrayed by Joe De Santis
 Archie Devlin, Capone's attorney, portrayed by George N. Neise
 Lucky Quinn, portrayed by John Kellogg
 Joe Aiello portrayed in two episodes (where he's killed off in both episodes) by H. M. Wynant and Grant Richards
 Phil D'Andrea, portrayed by Wally Cassell, and appearing only in the pilot and premiere
 "Fur" Sammons, portrayed by Richard Benedict, and appearing only in the pilot and premiere
 Tony "Mops" Volpe, portrayed by Herman Rudin, and appearing only in the pilot and premiere

Finally, heard in every episode, but never shown onscreen:

 Announcer: Les Lampson
 Narrator: Walter Winchell

Paul Picerni and Nicholas Georgiade were cast as gangsters in Capone and Nitti's mob in the 1959 pilot before being cast in the series.

* Steve London's character of Untouchable Jack Rossman (played in the "Scarface Mob" pilot by Paul Dubov), was in the series since the original season-one series episode, "The Empty Chair", not from season two on as is commonly reported.

** The character of Untouchable William Youngfellow, portrayed by Abel Fernandez, has been mistakenly referred to by Saturday Night Live actor Dan Aykroyd as "Youngblood". This name is incorrect.

Guest stars
The Untouchables (due to Robert Stack's star power as a successful motion picture actor), was notable for the large number of past and future motion picture and television stars who signed and appeared as guest stars on the show during its four-year run. These include: (S#=Season number, E#=Episode number)
 Luther Adler in S2E3 "Nicky", S2E22 "Murder Under Glass", S3E17 "Takeover"
 William Bendix in S1E9 The Tri-State Gang Dec'59
 Herbie Faye in S3E12 "Fall Guy"
 Jason Wingreen in S2E5 "The Mark of Cain", S2E14 "The Masterpiece", S2E20 "The Antidote", S2E30 "The King of Champagne", S3E5 "The Matt Bass Scheme", S4E5 "The Pea", S4E7 "The Eddie O'Gara Story", S4E28 "The Torpedo"
 John Hoyt in S1E19 "The Big Squeeze"
 Ted de Corsia in S1E5 "Ain't We Got Fun", S4E9 "Come and Kill Me"
 Anne Helm in S3E8 "Mankiller"
 Carole Eastman in S2E26 "Death for Sale"
 Claude Akins in S1E20 "The Unhired Assassin" Part 1, S3E28 "The Monkey Wrench", S4E23 The Spoiler
 Richard Anderson in S1E28 "The Frank Nitti Story"
 Norma Crane in S1E14 "Noise of Death", S2E2 "Jack Legs Diamond", S2E21 "The Lily Dallas Story"
 Joseph Campanella in S4E11 "The Floyd Gibbons Story"
  Vince Edwards in S1E7 " Mexican Stake out "
 Jack Elam in S1E13 in "Syndicate Sanctuary", S2E23	"Testimony of Evil", S3E26 "Pressure" 
 James MacArthur in S2E26 "Death for Sale"
 Robert Gist in S1E21 "The Unhired Assassin" Part 2
 Larry Gates in S1E17 "One Armed Bandit", S2E9 "The Larry Fay Story"
 H.M. Wynant in S1E3 "The Jake Lingle Killing", S4E22 "The Butcher's Boy"
 J. D. Cannon in S4E2 The Cooker in the Sky, S4E21 "The Man in the Cooler"
 Jeff Corey in S2E20 "The Antidote"
 Thomas Mitchell in S1E26 "The Underworld Bank"
 Gloria Talbott in S3E25 "The Contract"
 Michael Ansara in S2E3 "Nicky" and S2E16 "The Jamaica Ginger Story"
 Val Avery in S1E26 "The Underworld Bank", S2E6 "A Seat on the Fence"
 Edward Asner in S3E16 "The Death Tree", S4E1 "The Night They Shot Santa Claus " and Frank in two episodes, S4E8 "Elegy", S4E13 "Search for a Dead Man",
 Norman Burton in S2E32 "90-Proof Dame", S4E11 "The Floyd Gibbons Story"
 Paul Frees as radio announcer uncredited in S1E21 "The Unhired Assassin": Part 2
 Gene Lyons in S2E6 "A Seat on the Fence"
 Lee Phillips in S2E17 "Augie 'The Banker' Ciamino"
 Peggy Ann Garner in S4E8 "Elegy, S4E25 "The Giant Killer"
 Larry Parks in S2E21 "The Lilly Dallas Story"
 Jim Backus in S1E15 "Star Witness"
 Kevin Hagen in S2E27 "Stranglehold" and S3E27 "Arsenal"
 Albert Paulsen in S4E5 "The Pea"
 Al Ruscio in S1E8 "The Artichoke King", S3E19 "Element of Danger", S4E23 "The Spoiler"  
 Arlene Martel in S2E6 "A Seat on the Fence", S3E4 "The Genna Brothers"
 Joseph Ruskin in S1E7 "Mexican Stake-Out", S2E14 "The Masterpiece", S2E29 "The Seventh Vote", S3E3 "Tunnel of Horrors", S3E20 "The Maggie Storm Story", S4E17 "Blues for a Gone Goose"
 Linda Watkins in S2E21 "The Lily Dallas Story"
 Dan Frazer in S4E24 "One Last Killing"
 Mort Mills in S1E10 "The Dutch Schultz Story", S3E17 "Takeover"
 Paul Genge in S2E23 "Testimony of Evil", S3E2 "Power Play", S4E2 "Cooker in the Sky"
 Sam Jaffe in S2E17 "Augie 'The Banker' Ciamino"
 Martin Balsam in S3E3 "Tunnel of Horrors", S3E21 "Man in the Middle"
 June Dayton in S2E16 "The Jamaica Ginger Story"
 Bernard Kates in S1E26 "The Underworld Bank", S2E17 "Augie 'The Banker' Ciamino" 
 John Dehner in S2E28 "The Nero Rankin Story"
 Milton Selzer in S2E15 "The Organization, S3E5 "The Matt Bass Scheme", S3E22 "Downfall", S4E2 "Cooker in the Sky" 
 Richard Deacon in S1E20 "The Unhired Assassin part 1"
 Robert Emhardt in S2E9 "The Larry Fay Story", S3E12 "Fall Guy", S4E27 "The Jazz Man"
 Rebecca Welles in S2E17 "Augie 'The Banker' Ciamino"
 Whit Bissell in S1E11 "You Can't Pick the Number"
 Robert Cornthwaite in S2E23 "Testimony of Evil", S2E29 "The Seventh Vote"
 John Larkin in S3E25 "The Contract", S4E22 "The Butcher's Boy"
 Peter Whitney in S2E2 "Jack Legs Diamond", S4E21 " Man in The Cooler"
 Joan Blondell in S2E18 "The Underground Court"
 Robert F. Simon in S1E13 "Syndicate Sanctuary", S2E12 "The Big Train": Part 1
 Mickey Shaughnessy in S2E8 "Kiss of death Girl"
 Barbara Luna in S1E7 "Mexican Stake out", S3E16 "The Death Tree"
 Than Wyenn in S3E11 "The Canada Run", S4E20 "Junk Man"
 John McIntire in S2E6 "A Seat on the Fence"
 Nan Martin in S4E6 "Bird in the Hand"
 Scott Brady in S4E11 "The Floyd Gibbons Story"
 Robert Brubaker in S2E23 "Testimony of Evil"
 Charles Bronson in S3E16 "The Death Tree"
 Ruth White in S4E1 "The Night They Shot Santa Claus"
 Philip Pine in S1E3 "The Jake Lingle Killing", S2E3 "Nicky", S2E27 "Stranglehold" S3E15 "The Whitey Steele Story", S4E18 "Globe of Death"
 George Matthews in S3E27 "Aresnal", S4E4 "The Economist"
 William Schallert in S2E13 "The Big Train Part 2"
 Arthur Malet in S3E26 "Pressure", S4E25 "The Giant Killer"
 Frank Ferguson in S1E12 "The Underground Railway"
 Adam Williams in S1E2 "Ma Barker and Her Boys", S4E15 "The Snowball"
 Victor Buono as Melanthos Moon in S2E25 "Mr. Moon" and as Parnise Surigao in S3E13 "The Gang War"
 James Caan in S4E10 "A Fist of Five"
 Jeremy Slate in S1E22 "The White Slavers", S4E30 "A Taste for Pineapple"
 Steve Cochran in S2E7 "The Purple Gang", S2E32 "90-Proof Dame"
 Constance Ford in S2E31 "The Nick Acropolis Story"
 Anthony Caruso in S1E13 "Syndicate Sanctuary"
 Phyllis Coates in S1E5 "Ain't We Got Fun", S1E28 "The Frank Nitti Story", and S4E10 "A Fist of Five"
 James Coburn in S2E16 "The Jamaica Ginger Story"
 Mike Connors in S4E7 "The Eddie O'Gara Story"
 Richard Conte in S2E15 "The Organization", S4E3 "The Chess Game"
 Marc Lawrence in S1E15 "Star Witness", S3E4 "The Genna Brothers", S4E17 "Blues for a Gone Goose"
 Dan Dailey in S4E9 "Come and Kill Me"
 Robert Duvall in S4E17 "Blues for a Gone Goose"
 Peter Falk in S1E26 "The Underworld Bank", as Nate Selko in S3E1 "The Troubleshooter"
 Betty Field in S1E22 "The White Slavers"
 Ford Rainey in S4E9 "Come and kill Me", S4E29 "Line of Fire"
 John Marley in S1E18 "Little Egypt", S2E23 "Testimony of Evil"
 Louise Fletcher in S1E2 "Ma Barker and Her Boys" as a girlfriend to one of Ma's boys
 Woodrow Parfrey in S4E8 "Elegy", S4E24 "One Last Killing"
 Anne Francis in S1E24 "The Doreen Maney Story"
 Harry Guardino in S1E17 "One-Armed Bandits", S2E19 "The Nick Moses Story", S3E25 "The Contract"
 Dan Seymour in S1E23 "Three Thousand Suspects", S2E19 "The Nick Moses Story", S2E28 "The Nero Rankin Story", S4E12 "Doublecross"
 Norman Fell in S2E1 "The Rusty Heller Story"
 Dick Foran in S1E28 "The Frank Nitti Story"
 Dabbs Greer in S2E21 "The Lily Dallas Story", S3E11 "The Canada Run", S4E18 "Globe of Death"
 Clu Gulager as S1E6 Vincent 'Mad Dog' Coll
 Alan Hale, Jr. in S1E9 "The Tri State Gang"
 Marianna Hill in S4E10 A Fist of Five
 Michael Constantine, in S2E19 "The Nick Moses Story", S2E30 "The king of Champagne", S3E5 "The Matt Bass Scheme", S4E3 "The Chess Game", S4E20 "Junkman" 
 Arthur Hill in S3E11 "The Canada Run"
 Florence Halop in S1E9 "The Tri State Gang"
 Anne Jackson in S4E2 The Cooker in the Sky
 Werner Klemperer in S2E7 "The Purple Gang"
 Richard Bakalyan in S1E16 "The St. Louis Story", S2E12 "The Big Train Part 1", S2E19 "The Nick Moses Story", S3E16 "The Death Tree", S4E17 "Blues for a Gone Goose", S4E29 "Line of Fire"
 Dennis Patrick in S2E22 "Murder Under Glass"
 Christopher Dark in S1E24 "The Doreen Maney Story", S4E26" The Charlie Argos Story"
 Sheldon Allman in S2E24 "Ring of Terror", S3E28 "The Monkey Wrench", S4E19 "An Eye for An Eye"
 George Tobias in S3E6 "Loophole" 
 Howard Caine in S2E24 "Ring of Terror, S2E29 "The Seventh Vote"
 Malachi Throne in S4E4	"The Economist", S4E12 "Doublecross", S4E18	"Globe of Death"
 Connie Hines in S1E24 "The Doreen Maney Story"
 Patricia Owens in S4E26 "The Charlie Argos Story"
 Salome Jens in S3E27 Arsenal, S4E21 "The Man in the Cooler"
 Walter Burke in S2E24 "Ring of Terror", S4E18 "Globe of Death"
 Brian Keith in S2E16 "The Jamaica Ginger Story"
 George Kennedy as 'Birdie' the mute in S2E30 "The King of Champagne"
 Jack Klugman in S3E6 "Loophole", S4E19 "An Eye for an Eye"
 Gail Kobe in S1E13 "Syndicate Sanctuary", S4E28 "The Torpedo"
 Steven Hill in S2E2 "Jack Legs Diamond", S3E22 "Downfall"
 Cloris Leachman in S3E7 "Jigsaw", S3E21 "Man in the Middle"
 Sam Levene and June Havoc in S2E9 "The Larry Fay Story"
 Marge Redmond in S4E25 "The Giant Killer"
 Jack Lord in S1E3 "The Jake Lingle Killing"
 Harold J. Stone in S2E1 "The Rusty Heller Story", S2E11 "The Tommy Karples Story", S2E24 "Ring of Terror", S3E10 "Hammerlock", S3E26 "Pressure", S4E24 "One Last Killing"
 Dan O'Herlihy in S1E19 "The Big Squeeze"
 Gavin MacLeod as a minor criminal with almost the exact same last name of "McLeod" in S1E9 "The Tri State Gang", also S2E12 & S2E13 "The Big Train" part 1 & 2, S3E6 "Loophole", and S3E21 "Man in the Middle"
 Dorothy Malone in S4E11 "The Floyd Gibbons Story"
 Joe Mantell as George Ricci (Brandy LaFrance's husband) in the 2-hour pilot, and as Giuseppe Zangara in S1E20 & S1E21 "The Unhired Assassin" part 1 & 2
 Frank Silvera in S2E6 "A Seat on the Fence"
 Lee Marvin in S2E31 "The Nick Acropolis Story", S3E19 "Element of Danger", S4E10 "A Fist of Five"
 Robert Middleton as Mayor Anton Cermak in S1E20 & S1E21 "The Unhired Assassin" part 1 & 2, also S2E14 "The Masterpiece", S2E30 "The King of Champagne"
 Martin Landau in S1E7 "Mexican Stakeout", S3E6 "Loophole"
 Dolores Dorn in S3E28 "The Monkey Wrench"
 Bert Freed in S1E23 "Three Thousand Suspects"
 Ricardo Montalbán in S2E27 "Stranglehold"
 Marc Lawrence in S1E15 "Star Witness", S3E04"The Genna Brothers", and S4E17 "Blues for a Gone Goose"
 Wesley Lau in S2E8 "Kiss of Death Girl"
 Elizabeth Montgomery as Rusty Heller (received a nomination for the 13th Primetime Emmy Award for an "Outstanding Performance in a Supporting Role by an Actor or Actress in a Single Program") S2/E1 "The Rusty Heller Story" (1960)
 Joanna Moore in S2E28 The Nero Rankin Story
 Harry Morgan as Bugs Moran in S4E12 "Doublecross"
 Lawrence Dobkin as Dutch Schultz in S1E6 "Vincent Mad Dog Call", S1E10 "The Dutch Schultz Story", S2E2 "Jack Legs Diamond" 
 Vic Morrow in S2E11 "The Tommy Karpeles Story", S3E20 "The Maggie Storm Story"
 J. Carrol Naish in S1E14 "The Noise of Death"
 Simon Oakland in S3E11 "The Canada Run", S3E22 "Downfall", S4E27 "The Jazzman"
 Robert H. Harris in S2E8 "Kiss of Death Girl"
 Patricia Neal in S3E20 "The Maggie Storm Story"
 Barbara Nichols in Pilot of The Untouchables, S1E1 The Empty Chair
 Henry Jones and Edward Andrews in S1E25 "Portrait of a Thief"
 Leslie Nielsen in S1E23 "Three Thousand Suspects", who'd later co-star with Robert Stack in Airplane!, satirizing their serious roles in dramas like The Untouchables
 Sheree North in S4E13 Search for a Dead Man
 John Kellogg in S3E13 "Gang War", S3E20 "The Maggie Storm Story", S4E!2 "Doublecross"
 Albert Salmi in S3E2 "Power Play"
 Vaughn Taylor in S1E2 "Ma Barker and Her Boys", S2E24 "Ring of Terror", S3E6 "Loophole"
 Leonard Nimoy in S3E17 "Takeover"
 Joe De Santis in S1E12"The Underground Railway", S2E3 "Nicky", S2E19 "The Nick Moses Story", S4E20 "Junk Man", S4E29 "Line of Fire"
 Warren Oates in S3E26 "Pressure"
 Susan Cummings in S1E18 "Little Egypt"
 Carroll O'Connor in S3E2 "Power Play", S4E6 "Bird in the Hand"
 Jay Adler in S1E9 "The Tri State Gang", S2E9 "The Larry Fay Story", S3E8 "ManKiller", S4E3 "The Chess Game"
 Susan Oliver in S2E15 "The Organization"
 Victor Jory in S3E19 "Element of Danger"
 Nehemiah Persoff as Jake "Greasy Thumb" Guzik in three episodes, S1E1 "The Empty Chair", S2E29 "The Seventh Vote", S4E12 "Doublecross", also S1E27 "Head of Fire- Feet of Clay", S2E4 "The Waxey Gordon Story", S3E18 "The Stryker Brothers"
 Harry Guardino in S1E17 "One Armed Bandits", S2E19 "The Nick Moses Story", S3E25 "The Contract"
 Robert Redford in S4E15 "Snowball"
 Sterling Holloway in S1E21 "The Unhired Assassin: Part 2"
 Madlyn Rhue in S1E27 "Head of Fire- Feet of Clay", S2E11 "The Tommy Karpeles Story"
 Cliff Robertson in S1E12 "The Underground Railway"
 Ruth Roman in S3E8 Man Killer
 Telly Savalas in S2E20 "The Antidote", S3E5 "The Matt Bass Scheme", S4E14 "The Speculator"
 Johnny Seven in S1E10 "The Dutch Schultz Story", S2E23 " Testimony of Evil ", S2E31 " The Nick Acropolis Story ", S3E27 Arsenal, S4E24 " One Last Killing"
 Henry Silva as Little Charlie Sebastino in two episodes, S1E14 "The Noise of Death", S2E5 "The Mark of Cain", also S3E15 "The Whitey Steele Story"
 Barbara Stanwyck in S4E8 Elegy, S4E13 Search for a Dead Man
 Suzanne Storrs in S1E6 Vincent 'Mad Dog' Coll, S2E2 Jack 'Legs' Diamond
 Nita Talbot in S1E22 "The White Slavers", S4E1 "The Night They Shot Santa Claus"
 Mike Kellin in S1E14 "Noise of Death", S1E22 "The White Slavers", S3E9 "City Without a Name"
 Frank Sutton in four episodes, S3E18 "The Stryker Brothers", S3E25 "The Contract", S4E14 "The Speculator", S4E22 "The Butcher's Boy"
 Joyce Van Patten in S4E23 "The Spoiler"
 Rip Torn as aka "Pittsburgh Phil" in S2/E14 "The Masterpiece", S4/E23 "The Spoiler"
 Claire Trevor as Ma Barker in S1E2 "Ma Barker and her Boys"
 Lee Van Cleef in S1E20 & E21 "The Unhired Assassin" part 1 & 2
 Robert Vaughn as Charlie Argos S4/E26 The Charlie Argos Story
 Viveca Lindfors S2E24 "Ring of Terror"
 Jack Warden in S1E4 "The George 'Bugs' Moran Story", S1E27 "Head of Fire-Feet of Clay", S2E10 "The Otto Frick Story"
 Jack Weston in S1E8 The Artichoke King
 Joanna Barnes in S2E32 "90-Proof Dame"
 David White in S1E10 "The Dutch Schultz Story", and S2E1 "The Rusty Heller Story"; in the latter, appearing with his later Bewitched colleague Elizabeth Montgomery
 Dick York in S1E22 "The White Slavers"
 John Anderson in S2E6 "A Seat on the Fence", S4E16 "Jake Dance", S4E28 "The Torpedo"
 Ned Glass in S1E23 "Three Thousand Suspects", S2E26 "Death for Sale", S3E1 "The Troubleshooter", S4E3 "The Chess Game"
 Ed Nelson in S2E21 "The Lily Dallas Story", S3E13 "The Gang War", S4E29 "Line of Fire"
 Fred Clark in S1E18 "little Egypt"
 Jeanne Cooper in S3E23 "The Case Against Eliot Ness", S4E24 "One Last Killing"
 Leo Gordon in S1E16 "The St. Louis Story", S1E27 "Head of Fire: Feet of Clay"
 Warren Stevens in S2E32 "90-Proof Dame"
 Richard Devon in S2E18 "The Underground Court"
 Vic Perrin in S2E5 "The Mark of Cain", S2E18 "The Underground Court", S3E9	"City Without a Name", S4E25 "The Giant Killer"
 Paul Richards in S3E9 "City Without A Name", S4E25 "The Giant Killer"
 Theodore Marcuse in S1E17 "One Armed Bandits", S3E9 "City Without a Name", S3E16 "The Death Tree", S4E6 "Bird in the Hand", S4E29 "Line of Fire"
 Antony Carbone in S1E15 "Star Witness", S2E2 "Jack 'Legs' Diamond", S3E4 "The Genna Brothers", S4E13 "Search for a Dead Man"
 Oscar Beregi in S2E2 "Jack 'Legs' Diamond", S2E15 "The Organization", S2E27 "Stranglehold", S3E10 "Hammerlock", S3E15 "The Whitey Steele Story", S3E17 "Takeover", S3E25 "The Contract", S3E28 "The Monkey Wrench"
 Leonard Stone in S2E31 "The Nick Acropolis Story"
 David Brian in S1E16 "The St. Louis Story", S2E23 "Testimony of Evil"
 Sean McClory in S3E15 "The Whitey Steele Story", S4E7 "The Eddie O'Gara Story"

Broadcast history
The Untouchables originally aired as a segment of the anthology series Desilu Playhouse in 1959. It was picked up as a regular series by ABC for the 1959 season and was aired on Thursdays from 9:30 to 10:30pm from 1959 to 1962, switching to Tuesday evenings from 9:30 to 10:30pm for its final season (1962–63).

Desilu Productions president Desi Arnaz had originally offered the role of Ness to Van Johnson. Johnson's wife and manager rejected the deal, and demanded double the salary offer. Arnaz refused and signed Stack instead. Arnaz had had a long business relationship with CBS, which had aired many Desilu programs, including I Love Lucy and The Lucy-Desi Comedy Hour. When CBS refused to buy the program, Arnaz sold it to ABC.

Neville Brand reprised his role as Al Capone in the 1961 film The George Raft Story.

Some segments were released to theaters as movies: The Scarface Mob (from the two-part pilot), The Alcatraz Express (from "The Big Train"), and The Gun of Zangara (from "Unhired Assassin").

On November 10, 1991, NBC ran the two-hour film The Return of Eliot Ness, with Robert Stack as Ness. It was set in 1947, after Capone's death, and depicted Ness investigating the death of an Untouchables agent named Labine.

Legacy
The Untouchables was a landmark television series  that has spawned numerous imitators over the decades, such as S.W.A.T., The F.B.I., Crime Story, the original Hawaii Five-O (Five-O's creator and executive producer, Leonard Freeman, served as executive producer on The Untouchables final season), Robert Stack's two later series, Strike Force and Most Wanted, The Hat Squad, and the 1993 The Untouchables syndicated TV series.

It also inspired films such as Al Capone starring Rod Steiger, The Untouchables (with Kevin Costner), Gangster Squad, Mulholland Falls, and others.
The Untouchables is one of two series from 1959, the other being The Detectives, together credited with the concept of depicting a group of crime fighters. Previously, most TV crime dramas had followed one of two formats: either a duo composed of a stalwart police officer or detective and his trusty sidekick/partner (Dragnet, The Lineup), or a lone-wolf private eye or police detective (Peter Gunn, Richard Diamond, M-Squad).

Assessments of Cultural Impact 
In their 1988 book, The Critics' Choice—The Best of Crime and Detective TV, authors Max Allan Collins and John Javna chose The Untouchables as one of the "Top 10 Best Police TV Series (Police Procedurals) of All Time".

The Lebanon (Pa.) Daily News said of The Untouchables: "Between the hard-nosed approach, sharp dialogue, and a commendably crisp pace (something rare in dramatic TV at the time), this series is one of the few that remains fresh and vibrant. Only the monochrome presentation betrays its age. The Untouchables is one of the few Golden Age TV shows that deserves being called a classic."

In 2019, a 60th Anniversary Retrospective titled The Untouchables Retrospective was undertaken to celebrate the show's cultural impact and legacy in television and film history through mixed media, including extensive episode reviews, a podcast, and a making-of documentary. To date, the retrospective has interviewed several surviving participants involved with the program, including Pat Crowley and Nehemiah Persoff.

In Popular Culture 
In Billy Wilder's Academy Award-winning 1960 movie The Apartment, a corporate telephone operator being romanced by an executive objects to the rescheduling of a tryst as it will conflict with the broadcasting of The Untouchbles.

Warner Bros. Television spoofed the Untouchables series in the 1963 Merrie Melodies cartoon short The Unmentionables, with Bugs Bunny playing the role of Elegant Mess, a crime fighter assigned to infiltrate a black market ring operated by Rocky and Mugsy. 

The series was also spoofed on an episode of the 1961-62 ABC-TV/Hanna-Barbera cartoon series Top Cat entitled "The Unscratchables". 

NBC's Saturday Night Live spoofed The Untouchables several times during the 1970s, with Dan Aykroyd playing Eliot Ness. Incidentally, Aykroyd would parody another popular TV police procedural from the era, Dragnet, in 1987, which co-starred Tom Hanks.

On a 1981 telecast of NBC-TV's The Tonight Show, The Untouchables was spoofed with a skit entitled: "The Video Untouchables", with host Johnny Carson portraying Agent "Eliot Nielsen", whose squad apprehended citizens who unlawfully videotaped T.V. programs. The video survives today on YouTube.

Episodes

In 1997, the episode "The Rusty Heller Story" was ranked number 99 on TV Guides 100 Greatest Episodes of All Time.

Home media

Region 1
CBS DVD (distributed by Paramount Home Entertainment) have released all four seasons of The Untouchables on DVD in region 1, all digitally remastered from the original negatives and presented uncut, unedited and in its original broadcast order. The first two seasons have also been released in region 4.

On May 10, 2016, CBS DVD released The Untouchables- The Complete Series on DVD in Region 1.

Region 2
Paramount Home Entertainment released the first three seasons of The Untouchables on DVD in the UK. These releases are full-season sets as opposed to Region 1 and 4, where each season has been split into two volumes. The complete series (all 4 seasons) was released on DVD in the UK on May 29, 2017 by Medium Rare Entertainment.

Merchandising
The TV show was also adapted into a comic book by Dan Spiegle, distributed by Dell Comics.

References

Further reading
 Tucker, Kenneth. Eliot Ness and the Untouchables: The Historical Reality and the Film and Television Depictions. Jefferson, North Carolina: McFarland & Company, 2000. 
 Vahimagi, Tise. "The Untouchables" London, England: BFI Publishing, 1998.  (Detailed study of the series and episode guide)

External links

 
 Encyclopedia of Television 
 Episode Broadcast Dates
 Unedited open to The Untouchables
 The Untouchables on YouTube
 The Untouchables 2 on YouTube 
 internet movie cars database

1959 American television series debuts
1963 American television series endings
1950s American crime drama television series
1960s American crime drama television series
American Broadcasting Company original programming
Black-and-white American television shows
Cultural depictions of Al Capone
Cultural depictions of American men
Cultural depictions of Bugs Moran
Cultural depictions of Dutch Schultz
Cultural depictions of Eliot Ness
Cultural depictions of Frank Nitti
Cultural depictions of Louis Buchalter
Cultural depictions of Lucky Luciano
Cultural depictions of American police officers
Cultural depictions of gangsters
English-language television shows
Great Depression television series
Nonlinear narrative television series
Television series based on books
Television series based on actual events
Television series by CBS Studios
Television series set in the 1930s
Television series set in 1931
Television series set in 1932
Television shows set in Chicago
Television series about organized crime
Television series by Desilu Productions
Television shows adapted into comics
The Untouchables
Works about the Chicago Outfit